Galbiati is an Italian surname. Notable people with the surname include:

Delfi Galbiati (1944–2015), Uruguayan actor
Enzo Galbiati (1897–1982), Italian soldier and fascist politician
Italo Galbiati (born 1937), Italian footballer and manager
Ludovigo Galbiati (1577–1638), Italian Roman Catholic bishop
Roberto Galbiati (born 1957), Italian footballer and manager
Rossella Galbiati (born 1958), Italian racing cyclist

Italian-language surnames